Richard Packer may refer to:

 Richard Packer (civil servant), former British civil servant
 Richard Packer (politician) (1794–1872), New Zealand politician
 Dick Packer, American soccer player